TV Scrabble is a British television version of the popular board game, which aired on Challenge TV from 1 October 2001 to 2003.

Premise
Four players competed in two games on each show. Two players play each game facing each other one-on-one with the winners playing in the daily final at the end of the show. In each game there were two rounds.

Duplicate Scrabble
In this round, the players had the same seven tiles and had to try to find the best scoring combination possible within 20 seconds (25 seconds in series 2). They inputted their moves with a touch screen and stylus and the tiles would fly out of the podiums onto a giant upright Scrabble board. Contestants scored points for the word they made but only the higher scoring word remained on the board to be played off for the next go. This would be played four or five times.

Speed Scrabble
The second round was Speed Scrabble. Each player was given a clean board and had just one minute to formulate as many words and score as high as they can. They would take their minutes in turn.

Daily Final
The winner of the first game would do battle with the winner of the second game in the daily final. This time, the players would be playing Speed Scrabble but sharing the same board. One person would be in control of it for 30 seconds, swapping control after time expires. After two minutes (that's a minute each), the scores would be added to the scores from their earlier rounds to find the day's winner.

The four winners from Monday to Thursday programs battled it out on the Friday Final for a shot at Finals Week and a holiday.

The last episode featured the winner of the remote control interactive winner and the winner of series 3 (Mark Bunce)

Problem
During a celebrity special in the first series, contestant Mike McClean had problems in the first half as his touch screen was seemingly not functioning properly and ended up scoring only 5 points total in that half. The technical problem was rectified in the second half.

External links

Scrabble on television
2000s British game shows
2001 British television series debuts
2003 British television series endings
Scrabble in the United Kingdom